The Battle of Mhlatuze River was a battle fought between the Zulu and Ndwandwe tribes in 1820 following the Zulu Civil War. The Ndwandwe hierarchy was set asunder by the battle, and largely scattered their population in response.

History
In 1818, Shaka had been attacked by Qwabe warriors led by Phakathwayo along the same river.

The battle
The battle of Mhlatuz was an open military confrontations between Shaka the commander of Zulu land and Zwide the commander of Nwandwe. The battle occurred with the intention of eliminating Shaka's Army from the Zwide side, which finally led to the defeat and elimination of Zwide by Shaka the Zulu. 
The Zulu people prevailed in battle, led by military commander Shaka. As in the Battle of Gqokli Hill, Shaka's superior tactics led his people to victory. When the Ndwandwe attack came, he waited until about half were on each side of the river, effectively splitting the attackers into two separate groups which allowed a Zulu victory.

See also
 Mhlatuze River

References

Mhlatuze River
Mhlatuze River
19th century in Africa
1820 in South Africa
History of KwaZulu-Natal
Mfecane